Killowen (now spelt Cill Eoin), alternatively spelt Cill Abhainn  is a small village in County Down, Northern Ireland. It is near Rostrevor and on the shore of Carlingford Lough. In the 2001 Census it had a population of 159 people. It lies within the Newry and Mourne District Council area.

History
Near Killowen, on the shore of the loch, is Ballinran Court Tomb. It was excavated in 1976 in advance of a road widening scheme.

Education 
Killowen Primary School

Climate

People 
Charles Russell, Baron Russell of Killowen, a 19th-century statesman and Lord Chief Justice.
Patrick Murphy, the Irish Giant.

References 

Killowen Historical Society
NI Neighbourhood Information System

Villages in County Down